The 2023 Upper Austria Ladies Linz was a professional women's tennis tournament played on indoor hard courts. It was the 32nd edition of the tournament, and part of the WTA 250 series of the 2023 WTA Tour. It was held at the Design Center Linz in Linz, Austria, from 6 to 12 February 2023. Due to scheduling issues, the October 2022 edition was delayed to February 2023 in order to attract top WTA players to compete in the tournament.

Champions

Singles 

  Anastasia Potapova def.  Petra Martić, 6–3, 6–1

Doubles 

  Natela Dzalamidze /  Viktória Kužmová def.  Anna-Lena Friedsam /  Nadiia Kichenok 4–6, 7–5, [12–10]

Points and prize money

Point distribution

Prize money

1 Qualifiers prize money is also the Round of 32 prize money
* per team

Singles entrants

Seeds 

 Rankings as of January 30, 2023

Other entrants 
The following players received wildcards into the singles main draw:
  Julia Grabher
  Sofia Kenin 
  Eva Lys 

The following player received entry using a protected ranking:
  Jaqueline Cristian

The following players received entry from the qualifying draw:
  Marina Bassols Ribera
  Sara Errani
  Anna-Lena Friedsam
  Dalma Gálfi
  Rebeka Masarova
  Viktoriya Tomova

The following players received entry as lucky losers:
  Varvara Gracheva
  Kamilla Rakhimova
  Clara Tauson

Withdrawals 
 Before the tournament
  Elisabetta Cocciaretto → replaced by  Tamara Korpatsch
  Danka Kovinić → replaced by  Kamilla Rakhimova
  Jasmine Paolini → replaced by  Alycia Parks
  Kateřina Siniaková → replaced by  Clara Tauson
  Patricia Maria Țig → replaced by  Varvara Gracheva

Retirements 
  Dalma Gálfi (right thigh injury)

Doubles entrants

Seeds 

1 Rankings as of January 30, 2023

Other entrants 
The following pairs received wildcards into the doubles main draw:
  Veronika Bokor /  Alina Michalitsch
  Melanie Klaffner /  Sinja Kraus  

The following pair received entry using a protected ranking:
  Andrea Gámiz /  Georgina García Pérez

Withdrawals 
  Monique Adamczak /  Rosalie van der Hoek → replaced by  Jesika Malečková /  Rosalie van der Hoek
  Alicia Barnett /  Olivia Nicholls → replaced by  Andrea Gámiz /  Georgina García Pérez
  Anna Bondár /  Kimberley Zimmermann → replaced by  Bibiane Schoofs /  Kimberley Zimmermann
  Nadiia Kichenok /  Makoto Ninomiya → replaced by  Anna-Lena Friedsam /  Nadiia Kichenok

References

External links 
 

2023 WTA Tour
2023
Upper Austria Ladies Linz
Upper Austria Ladies Linz